Great Ridge is a ridge separating the vales of Edale and Castleton in Derbyshire, England.

A path runs along the length of the ridge, and is roughly paved to prevent erosion caused by the large number of visitors. The only steep section of the path is Back Tor, just east of Hollins Cross, which may not be suitable for the very infirm.

West of Mam Tor, the high ground continues, slightly changing direction, as Rushup Edge.

The ridge is featured in the 2018 racing video game Forza Horizon 4 as part of the game's world.

References

External links
 The Great Ridge (pdf) – description and map of a walk along the ridge from Country Walking
 Walking the Great Ridge from Edale
 Walking the Great Ridge from Hope

Mountains and hills of Derbyshire
Mountains and hills of the Peak District
Ridges of England